Bakari may refer to:

 Bakari (name) (includes a list of people with the name)
 Bakari, Togo, a village in Togo
 , a village in the commune of Touboro, Cameroon

See also 
 Bacari
 Bakhari
 Bakary
 Bakairi (disambiguation)
 Bakeri (disambiguation)